Aakhari Decision is a Bollywood action film directed by Deepak Bandhu. The film stars Amar Sidhu and Sumona Chakravarti with Anant Jog and Nagesh Bhonsle playing important roles. It was filmed in India and the United States.

Cast
Amar Sidhu as Arjun Jaiswal
Sumona Chakravarti as Mansi
Anant Jog as Commissioner Shyam Singh
Nagesh Bhonsle as Victor
Mushtaq Khan
Kamlesh Sawant as Rajeev Chowdhary
Navni Parihar

Soundtrack

Box office
The film was profitably released in phases all over India as well as in theaters across the United States. It was one of few films selected for screening out of thousands of entries for the Pravasi Film Festival in Delhi, India in Jan 2010.

References

External links
 

2010s Hindi-language films
2010 films
Hindi-language action films